Jeghanab (also Romanized as Jeghanāb and Jaghanāb; also known as Dzhigana, Jeqanāb, Jiganāb, and Joghnab) is a village in Bedevostan-e Gharbi Rural District, Khvajeh District, Heris County, East Azerbaijan Province, Iran. At the 2006 census, its population was 449, in 93 families.

References 

Populated places in Heris County